Girl Problems is the second studio album by American country music singer Chris Lane. It was released on August 5, 2016 by Big Loud Records. Produced by Joey Moi, the album includes Lane's first #1 single, "Fix", his top 10 single, "For Her", as well as a cover of Mario's 2004 hit, "Let Me Love You".

Commercial performance
The album debuted at number 55 on the Billboard 200 chart, and at number 8 on the Top Country Albums chart, selling 6,200 copies in its first week. According to Nielsen Music Connect, the album has sold 230,000 copies in the US as of July 2018.

Critical reception
Stephen Thomas Erlewine of AllMusic rated the album 3 out of 5 stars, comparing Lane's R&B influences to Thomas Rhett and Sam Hunt, while adding that "he navigates the lithe stylistic flourishes with ease, and the gloss of the record is appealing."

Track listing

Source:

Personnel
Adapted from AllMusic

Sarah Buxton - background vocals
Dave Cohen - keyboards
David Dorn - keyboards
Matt Dragstrem - programming
Jesse Frasure - keyboards, programming
Wes Hightower - background vocals
Charlie Judge - keyboards
Chris Lane - lead vocals, background vocals
Sid Menon - background vocals
Joey Moi - electric guitar, keyboards, percussion, percussion programming, programming, background vocals
Jamie Moore - keyboards
Russ Pahl - pedal steel guitar
Mackenzie Porter - featured vocals on "Circles"
Danny Rader - acoustic guitar
Adam Shoenfeld - electric guitar
Jimmie Lee Sloas - bass guitar
Bryan Sutton - dobro, acoustic guitar
Ilya Toshinsky - banjo, bouzouki, acoustic guitar, electric guitar, mandolin

Charts

References 

2016 albums
Chris Lane albums
Albums produced by Joey Moi
Big Loud albums
Albums produced by Jesse Frasure